Mitchell, or St Michael (sometimes also called St Michael's Borough or Michaelborough) was a rotten borough consisting of the town (or village) of Mitchell, Cornwall. From the first Parliament of Edward VI, in 1547, it elected two members to the Unreformed House of Commons.

History
The borough encompassed parts of two parishes, Newlyn East and St Enoder. Like most of the Cornish boroughs enfranchised or re-enfranchised during the Tudor period, it was a rotten borough from the start.

The franchise in Mitchell was a matter of controversy in the 17th century, but was settled by a House of Commons resolution on 20 March 1700 which stated  "That the right of election of members to serve in Parliament for the Borough of St Michael's, in the County of Cornwall, is in the portreeves, and lords of the manor, who are capable of being portreeves, and the inhabitants of the said borough paying scot and lot": this gave the vote to most of the male householders.

The borough was often not in the complete control of a single proprietor, the voters being swayed between those of the lords of the manor from whom they expected to receive most benefit in return. Namier quotes a memorandum on the state of the Cornish boroughs from Lord Edgcumbe to Prime Minister Newcastle in 1760, describing the Mitchell voters as "in general low, indigent people, [who] will join such of the Under Lords from whom they have reason to expect most money and favours. Admiral Boscawen..., by supplying some of the voters with money and conferring favours on others, seems to be adding very considerably to the strength of his interest."

The landowners, however, had other expedients for gaining control. The number of voters, which in 1784 had been at least 39, was reduced by 1831 to just seven, achieved by pulling down a number of houses in the borough and letting those houses that still stood on conditions which prevented the occupiers appearing on the parish rates. The proprietors by the 1820s were the Earl of Falmouth (a Boscawen) and Sir Christopher Hawkins, Hawkins having purchased his interest some years previously from Sir Francis Basset; but Mitchell having thus been reduced to one of the smallest of all the rotten boroughs (in 1831, the borough had a population of approximately 90, and 23 houses), it was naturally disfranchised by the Great Reform Act of 1832.

Mitchell's early MPs included the explorer and statesman Walter Raleigh, who sat briefly for the borough in the 1590s while out of favour at court and so unable to secure a more prestigious seat. A later MP was the future Duke of Wellington, who as Sir Arthur Wellesley represented the borough from January to May 1807, for part of which time he was a junior minister (Chief Secretary for Ireland) in the Duke of Portland's second government.

Members of Parliament

1547–1629

1640–1832

Notes

References

D Brunton & D H Pennington, “Members of the Long Parliament” (London: George Allen & Unwin, 1954)
Cobbett's Parliamentary history of England, from the Norman Conquest in 1066 to the year 1803 (London: Thomas Hansard, 1808) 
 Maija Jansson (ed.), Proceedings in Parliament, 1614 (House of Commons) (Philadelphia: American Philosophical Society, 1988)
 J. E. Neale, The Elizabethan House of Commons (London: Jonathan Cape, 1949)
 T. H. B. Oldfield, The Representative History of Great Britain and Ireland (London: Baldwin, Cradock & Joy, 1816)
J Holladay Philbin, "Parliamentary Representation 1832 - England and Wales" (New Haven: Yale University Press, 1965)
Henry Stooks Smith, "The Parliaments of England from 1715 to 1847" (2nd edition, edited by FWS Craig - Chichester: Parliamentary Reference Publications, 1973)
 

Constituencies of the Parliament of the United Kingdom established in 1547
Constituencies of the Parliament of the United Kingdom disestablished in 1832
Parliamentary constituencies in Cornwall (historic)
Rotten boroughs